The 2001 Kerry Senior Football Championship was the 101st staging of the Kerry Senior Football Championship since its establishment by the Kerry County Board in 1889. The draw for the opening round fixtures took place on 3 April 2001. The championship ran from 1 June to 28 October 2001. It was the last championship to be played using a straight knockout format until 2020.. 

Dr. Crokes entered the championship as the defending champions, however, they were beaten by Austin Stacks in the semi-finals.

The final was played on 28 October 2001 at FitzGerald Stadium in Killarney, between An Ghaeltacht and Austin Stacks, in what was their first ever meeting in the final. An Ghaeltacht won the match by 1-13 to 0-10 to claim their first ever championship title.

An Ghaeltacht's Aodán Mac Gearailt was the championship's top scorer with 2-20.

Results

Preliminary round

Round 1

Quarter-finals

Semi-finals

Final

Championship statistics

Top scorers

Overall

In a single game

Miscellaneous

 An Ghaeltacht won the title for the very first time in their history. They became the first rural club to do so since Ballymacelligott in 1918.
 Austin Stacks qualified for the final for the first time since 1994.
 Glenflesk make their first appearance at senior level.

References

Kerry Senior Football Championship
2001 in Gaelic football